Kino Delorge (born 5 January 1998) is a Belgian professional footballer who plays as a full-back for Virton.

Club career
Delorge made his Eerste Divisie debut for FC Dordrecht on 22 September 2017 in a game against Helmond Sport.

International career
Delorge played for the Belgium national under-17 football team at the 2015 UEFA European Under-17 Championship and 2015 FIFA U-17 World Cup.

References

External links
 
 

1998 births
Living people
Sportspeople from Hasselt
Footballers from Limburg (Belgium)
Belgian footballers
Association football defenders
Belgium youth international footballers
Belgian Pro League players
Eerste Divisie players
Liga I players
Regionalliga players
K.R.C. Genk players
FC Dordrecht players
FC Dinamo București players
Lierse Kempenzonen players
SV 19 Straelen players
R.E. Virton players
Belgian expatriate footballers
Belgian expatriate sportspeople in the Netherlands
Expatriate footballers in the Netherlands
Belgian expatriate sportspeople in Romania
Expatriate footballers in Romania
Belgian expatriate sportspeople in Germany
Expatriate footballers in Germany